Richard Milnes may refer to:

 Richard Slater Milnes (1759–1804), English heir, landowner and politician
 Richard Monckton Milnes, 1st Baron Houghton (1809–1885), English poet, patron of literature and politician